The preliminary round of the 1992 Summer Olympics roller hockey competition was played between 26 and 30 July, consisting of a group stage with two groups of six teams. The teams distribution into the groups was performed as per the results at the 1991 Rink Hockey World Championship. Each group was contested at a specific venue and all teams in the same group played against each other one time for a total of 5 matches per team, one match per day. In the end, the best three teams qualified for the semi-finals.

Group A
This group included teams from Argentina, Italy, Japan, Portugal, Switzerland and the United States. The matches were played at the Pavelló de Club Patí Vic, in Vic. The three qualified teams were Italy, Portugal and Argentina.

Matches

Day 1

Day 2

Day 3

Day 4

Day 5

Group B
This group included teams from Angola, Australia, Brazil, Germany, Netherlands and Spain. The matches were played at the Pavelló de l'Ateneu de Sant Sadurní, in Sant Sadurní d'Anoia. The three qualified teams were Spain, Brazil and The Netherlands.

Matches

Day 1

Day 2

Day 3

Day 4

Day 5

Footnotes

See also
 Roller hockey at the 1992 Summer Olympics - Semi-finals

References
 
 

Roller hockey at the 1992 Summer Olympics